"I Know What I've Got" is a song recorded by American country music artist J.C. Crowley. It was released in February 1989 as the third single from his album Beneath the Texas Moon. The song peaked at number 21 on the Billboard Hot Country Singles chart and reached number 12 on the RPM Country Tracks chart in Canada.

Chart performance

References

1989 singles
J.C. Crowley songs
RCA Records singles
Song recordings produced by Josh Leo
Songs written by Jeff Silbar
1988 songs
Songs written by J.C. Crowley